Hazal is a Turkish female given name that means dried tree leaves and autumn flower.

Also a Kurdish name as Xezal that means gazelle.

 Hazal Kaya (born 1990), Turkish actress
 Hazal Sarıkaya (born 1996), Turkish swimmer
 Hazal Türesan (born 1985), Turkish actress

See also
 Chazal

References